The 2019-20 Ukrainian Amateur Cup season was scheduled to start on August 21, 2019.

None of the last season semifinal participants took part in the competition.

Participated clubs
In bold are clubs that are active at the same season AAFU championship (parallel round-robin competition).

 Cherkasy Oblast: LNZ-Lebedyn
 Chernihiv Oblast: Avanhard Koriukivka
 Dnipropetrovsk Oblast (2): Peremoha Dnipro, Skoruk Tomakivka
 Donetsk Oblast (3): Sapfir Kramatorsk, FC Pokrovsk, Yarud Mariupol
 Ivano-Frankivsk Oblast: Karpaty Halych
 Kharkiv Oblast: Univer-Dynamo Kharkiv
 Kherson Oblast: Tavria Novotroitske
 Kyiv Oblast: Rubikon-Vyshneve Kyiv
 Luhansk Oblast (2): Budivelnyk Lysychansk, Skif Shulhynka

 Lviv Oblast: Yunist Verkhnia Bilka
 Poltava Oblast (3): Olimpia Savyntsi, Lehion Poltava, SC Poltava
 Rivne Oblast (2): Mayak Sarny, ODEK Orzhiv
 Sumy Oblast (3): Veleten Hlukhiv, Viktoria Mykolaivka, LS Group Verkhnia Syrovatka
 Vinnytsia Oblast: Svitanok-Ahrosvit Shliakhova
 Volyn Oblast: Votrans Lutsk
 Zaporizhzhia Oblast: Tavria-Skif Rozdol
 Zhytomyr Oblast (3): Polissia Stavky, Zviahel Novohrad-Volynsky, Mal Korosten

Results

Preliminary round
First games will be played on 21 August/28 August and seconds on 4 September.

|}
Notes:
 On 27 August 2019 it became known that Avanhard Koryukivka withdrew right before the start of the tournament.

Round of 16
FC ODEK Orzhiv, FC Viktoriya Mykolaivka, FC LNZ-Lebedyn, FC Tavriya Novotroitske (all the season's league participants) received a bye to the round. First games will be played on 18 September and seconds on 25 September. Pairs were confirmed on 12 September 2019.

|}

Quarterfinals
First games will be played on 9 October and seconds on 16 October. Pairs were confirmed on 27 September 2019.

|}
Notes:

Semifinals
The dates of games are 8 and 15 July 2020.

|}

Final
The dates of games are 22 and 29 July 2020.

|}

See also
 2019–20 Ukrainian Football Amateur League
 2019–20 Ukrainian Cup

Notes

References

External links
 Official website of the Association of Amateur Football of Ukraine (AAFU)
 Artur Valerko. There started Ukrainian Cup among amateurs. Known details related to the tournament (Стартував Кубок України серед аматорів. Відомі деталі щодо турніру). Sport Arena. 22 August 2019.
 Artur Valerko. Overhead kick goal, "Police Academy", is the Ukrainian Cup among amateurs (Гол через себе, «поліцейська академія» – це Кубок України серед аматорів). Sport Arena. 29 August 2019.
 SC Poltava routed LS Group in the Ukrainian Cup among amateurs (СК Полтава розгромив LS Group у Кубку України серед аматорів). Sport Arena. 3 September 2019
 Artur Valerko. The AAFU Cup: a goal from corner kick, field player at a goal (Кубок ААФУ: гол із кутового, польовий в воротах). Sport Arena. 4 September 2019
 Artur Valerko. The AAFU Cup: Tauric derby, the rout from ODEK, and super goal of Afro-Ukrainian (Кубок ААФУ: таврійське дербі, розгром від ОДЕКа та супер-гол афроукраїнця). Sport Arena. 19 September 2019
 Artur Valerko. The AAFU Cup: Tauric derby, debut of the UEFA Cup holder (Кубок ААФУ: таврійське дербі, дебют володаря Кубка УЄФА). Sport Arena. 26 September 2019
 Artur Valerko. The AAFU Cup: Drama in Lebedyn, double strike in Novotroitske (Кубок ААФУ: драма в Лебедині, подвійний удар у Новотроїцькому). Sport Arena. 10 October 2019
 Artur Valerko. The AAFU Cup: further are going ODEK, Olimpiya, and Tavriya (Кубок ААФУ: далі йдуть ОДЕК, Олімпія та Таврія). Sport Arena. 17 October 2019
 Artur Valerko. The AAFU Cup: in first semifinals the difference is minimal (Кубок ААФУ: в первых полуфиналах — разница минимальна). Sport Arena. 9 July 2020.
 Artur Valerko. The AAFU Cup: the trophy will be played off by Olimpiya and Viktoriya (Кубок ААФУ: трофей разыграют Олимпия и Виктория). Sport Arena. 16 July 2020.
 Artur Valerko. The AAFU Cup: after the first final there is no clarity (Кубок ААФУ: после первого финала ясности нет). Sport Arena. 22 July 2020
 Olimpiya Savyntsi is a holder of the 2019–20 Ukrainian Amateur Cup («ОЛІМПІЯ» (САВИНЦІ) — ВОЛОДАР КУБКА УКРАЇНИ СЕРЕД АМАТОРІВ-2019/2020). Ukrainian Association of Football. 29 July 2020

Ukrainian Amateur Cup
Ukrainian Amateur Cup
Amateur Cup
Ukrainian Amateur Cup